Carl Schultz (born 1939) is a Hungarian-Australian film director.

Early life and works
He left his native Budapest during the uprising of 1956 with his brother Otto Schultz. They fled to England, and after arriving in London they moved to Manchester. In 1958, Schultz emigrated to Australia by himself, where he worked for Australian TV, first as a cameraman, and then as a director.

Professional career
In 1978, he directed his first feature film, Blue Fin, starring Hardy Kruger. His more notable film credits include Careful, He Might Hear You, winner of eight Australian Film Institute Awards, including Best Director and Best Film; Travelling North, with Leo McKern; and The Seventh Sign, starring Demi Moore and Jürgen Prochnow.

Awards 
 1982 — Nominated AFI Award Best Direction for: Goodbye Paradise (1983)
 1983 — Won AFI Award Best Director for: Careful, He Might Hear You (1983)
 1990 — Nominated for International Fantasy Film Award Best Film for: The Seventh Sign (1988)
 1997 — Nominated AFI Award Best Screenplay Adapted from Another Sourcefor: Love in Ambush (1997) (TV)

Filmography 
The Misanthrope (1974) (TV)
Ride on Stranger (1979) (mini-series)
A Place in the World (1979)
A Touch of Reverence (1984) (mini-series)
Blue Fin (1978)
Levkas Man (1981) (mini-series)
Goodbye Paradise (1983)
Careful, He Might Hear You (1983)
Travelling North (1987)
Bullseye (1987)
The Seventh Sign (1988)
To Walk with Lions (1999)
Love in Ambush (1997)

References

External links 
Carl Schultz at https://www.imdb.com/name/nm0776209/
IMDB - https://www.imdb.com/name/nm0776209
Film Database - http://www.citwf.com/person53779.htm
BBC - Movie review http://www.bbc.co.uk/films/2001/04/10/to_walk_with_lions_2000_dvd_review.shtml
New York Times - http://movies.nytimes.com/person/1164302/Carl-Schultz?scp=2&sq=carl%20schultz&st=cse

1939 births
Living people
Hungarian film directors
Australian film directors
Hungarian emigrants to England
Hungarian emigrants to Australia